Muyyam is a village located in the Kannur district of Kerala, India.

Location
Muyyam is located near Karimbam town in Taliparamba taluk of Kannur district in Kerala state.

Post office
There is a post office at Muyyam and the postal code is 670142.

References

Villages near Taliparamba